John Clare Cottage is a cottage and literary museum in Helpston, Peterborough, United Kingdom. The cottage was the birthplace of English poet John Clare (1793-1864).

The thatched Grade II* cottage at 12 Woodgate, Helpston, originally consisted of five smaller tenement buildings, that were joined into a single structure at a later date.

The cottage was bought by the John Clare Trust in 2005. In May 2007, the Trust gained £1.27 million of funding from the Heritage Lottery Fund and commissioned Jefferson Sheard Architects to create a new landscape design and Visitor Centre, including a cafe, shop and exhibition space. The Cottage was restored using traditional building methods and is open to the public.

In 2013 the John Clare Trust received a further grant from the Heritage Lottery Fund to help preserve the building and provide educational activities for young people visiting the cottage.

The garden behind the cottage is maintained by volunteers, and planted with varieties which would have been seen in Clare's time.

The John Clare Cottage forms part of the Fens Museum Partnership, along with Peterborough Museum and Flag Fen.

References

External links 
 Garden at John Clare Cottage
 John Clare cottage garden archaeological work

Literary museums in England
Biographical museums in Cambridgeshire
Buildings and structures in Peterborough
Grade II* listed buildings in Cambridgeshire